Hoài Nhơn is a district-level town (thị xã) of Bình Định province in the South Central Coast region of Vietnam. The town seat lies at Bồng Sơn.

Geography and infrastructure
Hoài Nhơn has a varied topography with coastline of around 20 km, lowlands and hills along its borders with Quảng Ngãi province to the north, Phù Mỹ District to the south and Hoài Ân and An Lão districts to the west. The district's highest elevation is on the border with An Lão at 682m.

Hoài Nhơn is located along National Road 1, Vietnam's most important road. Road 630 and Road 629 both lead to Hoài Ân District and An Lão District from the south of the district (south of Bồng Sơn).

History
Hoài Nhơn was the site of an uprising against French colonialism in 1945 (in Bồng Sơn), involving around 8000 people and led by Trịnh Hồng Kỳ.

As much of Bình Định Province, it was the site of severe fighting during the Vietnam War and a major battle in 1966.

In 2019, Hoài Nhơn experienced its most severe drought over the past 15 years along with other districts of Bình Định, with Mỹ Bình Lake reaching dead levels, or having a quantity too low for proper usage.

References

Districts of Bình Định province
County-level towns in Vietnam
Populated places in Bình Định province